Anderson High School is a public high school in the Forest Hills Local School District in Hamilton County, Ohio.

History

Established in 1929, Anderson High School is a high school in the Greater Cincinnati area. Anderson was a Blue Ribbon School from 1994 - 1996 as awarded by the United States Department of Education 
When founded, the school mascot was a comet, but the mascot was changed to Redskins prior to the 1936-37 school year.

In 2017, renovations began on the aging Anderson High School building as a result of a passage of a bond issue in 2014. The project included the installation of air conditioning, new science labs and art spaces, a multipurpose area off of the school's east side (primarily used as an auxiliary gym and weight room), upgraded security technology, handicap-accessibility features, and overall improvements to learning spaces. Construction is said to be done by the end of 2019.

Mascot
In July 2020, the board of the Forest Hills School District voted 4-1 to retire the Redskins as Anderson High's mascot. The new mascot, Raptors was announced in March, 2021.

Notable alumni 
 Thom Brennaman, sportscaster
 Richard Dotson, Former MLB pitcher
 Jensen Lewis, Former MLB pitcher
 Greg Mancz, NFL offensive lineman for the Houston Texans
 Andrew Norwell, NFL offensive lineman for the Washington Commanders]
 Dave Wilson, Olympic swimmer

Athletics
Anderson High School is a member of the OHSAA and participates in the Eastern Cincinnati Conference. Participation in the athletic program is open to all boys and girls interested and skilled enough to compete. Anderson offers a wide variety of athletic programs. For boys and girls, these include: cross country, golf, soccer, tennis, basketball, bowling, diving, swimming, track and field, and academic quiz team. For boys, these include: lacrosse, baseball, football, and wrestling. For girls, these include: dance team, gymnastics, volleyball and softball.

Ohio High School Athletic Association State Champions 

Anderson has won one state championship:
 Boys football  – 2007

References

External links
Forest Hills Local School District Website

High schools in Hamilton County, Ohio
Educational institutions established in 1929
Sports in Cincinnati
Public high schools in Ohio
1929 establishments in Ohio